is an anonymous wooden sculpture dated from 1286 depicting Jie Daishi (Priest Ryōgen), property of the Kongōrin-ji temple in Aishō, Shiga. It is designated an Important Cultural Property.

Ryōgen (912–985), also known as Jie Daishi, was the 18th chief abbot of Enryaku-ji, the head Tendai monastery located on Mount Hiei in Ōtsu. He is considered a restorer of the Tendai school of Mahayana Buddhism, and credited for reviving Enryaku-ji. It was Ryōgen'''s son Renmyo who requested the creation of a posthumous portrait of his father, in prayer for his rebirth in the Pure Land, the celestial realm in Mahayana Buddhism.

The sculpture was created during the Kamakura period (1185-1333), an era famous for its sculpture. It is currently owned by the Kongōrin-ji temple, one of the three Koto Sanzan'' temples of the Tendai school.

The sculpture is often on display in Room 3 of the Honkan (Japanese Gallery) of the Tokyo National Museum. The last time was from July 11 to October 1 of 2017. It was previously on exhibit in 2014 (July 23 to August 31),  and in 2012 (April 24 to July 16).

References

Wooden sculptures in Japan
Buddhist sculpture
Important Cultural Properties of Japan
Sculptures of the Tokyo National Museum